Mustafa Zihni Pasha (1838 Sulaimaniyah - 1929 Constantinople) was the son of a Baban prince, born in Sulaimaniyah he accompanied his father into exile to Constantinople.

As an Ottoman Kurd Mustafa Zihni held a number of influential Ottoman administrative posts. He was also a notable member of the Society for the Elevation of Kurdistan.

He was described by Barré de Lancy and Charles Woods as an honest, fair and impartial man, Mustafa Zihni was also described as belonging to the highest Ottoman class.

He had an estate in Constantinople where he lived with his three sons, Ahmet Naim Bey, Ismail Hakki Bey and Huseyin Shukru Bey.

Posts 
 Minister of Commerce and Public Works
 Vali (governor) of the provinces of Hejaz, Ioannina, Adana and Aleppo
 Member of the Senate of the Ottoman Empire
 Chief of naval operations
 Head inspector of the army
 Sultan's special representative to Crete
 Chief secretary (Mektupcu) of the Baghdad Province
 Sub-governor (Mutasarrıf) of Burdur, a sanjak within the province of Konya

References 

Pashas
1838 births
1911 deaths
Political people from the Ottoman Empire
Civil servants from the Ottoman Empire
Kurdish people from the Ottoman Empire
Government ministers of the Ottoman Empire
Committee of Union and Progress politicians
Ottoman governors of Aleppo
Members of the Senate of the Ottoman Empire